The Malta men's national field hockey team represents Malta in men's international field hockey competitions.

The team is operated by the Hockey Association Malta.

Tournament record

EuroHockey Championship
1970 – 19th place

EuroHockey Championship III
2017 – 5th place
2019 – 8th place
2021 – 7th place

EuroHockey Championship IV
2005 – 
2015 – 4th place
2021 – Cancelled

References

External links
 Hockey Association Malta

Nationla team
European men's national field hockey teams
Field hockey
Men's sport in Malta